Ozzie Cobb Lake is a small recreational lake in Pushmataha County, Oklahoma.

The lake, which was built in 1958, impounds the waters of Rock Creek.  It is named for J. Ozzie Cobb (1898-1965), an area resident.  It is managed by the Oklahoma Department of Wildlife Conservation.

References

External links
 Lake Ozzie Cobb - Oklahoma Department of Wildlife Conservation

Lakes of Oklahoma
Protected areas of Pushmataha County, Oklahoma
Lakes of Pushmataha County, Oklahoma